William L. Hawkins (27 July 1895 – 1990) was an American folk artist whose work began receiving acclaim in the 1980s. Hawkins frequently used a variety of media, including discarded materials, to create his paintings.

Hawkins' works have been exhibited in institutions such as the Smithsonian American Art Museum, American Folk Art Museum in New York City and San Diego's Mingei International Museum.

A major retrospective of Hawkins paintings was organized in 2018 by the Columbus Museum of Art, the Figge Art Museum in Davenport, Iowa.

References

Sources
New York Times review
Self-taught Genius exhibition from American Folk Art Museum
Educator's Guide from Mingei
Article on Hawkins at Hyperallergic
Hawkins profile for Art and Antiques Magazine

External links
William L. Hawkins profile for Smithsonian American Art Museum
William Hawkins profile at Artnet

1895 births
1990 deaths
Folk artists
People from Madison County, Kentucky
Artists from Kentucky
20th-century African-American artists